The Institute of Actuaries of India is the sole national apex body for actuaries in India. It was formed in September 1944 by the conversion of the Actuarial Society of India into a body corporate by virtue of the Actuaries Act, 2006. It is under the ownership of Ministry of Finance, Government of India.

Registration of the IAI
In 1979, it was admitted to the International Actuarial Association as a member.
On 14 December 1982, it was formally registered under Registration of Literary, Scientific and Charitable Societies Act XXI of 1960.
A certificate of registration of the ASI under section XII AA of Income Tax Act was received on 14 March 1984.
IAI is also registered under Public Charitable Trust Act 1950

Educational and ethical goals
 To prepare "actuaries of tomorrow" who are adequately qualified and competent in the global context.
 To keep the level of competence on a continuing basis for fully qualified Actuaries at a high in the global context through CPD (Continuing Professional Development) and other programs.
 To serve the cause of public interest through Professional Code of Conduct and Disciplinary Procedures.

Objectives
 Advancement of the actuarial profession in India.
 Providing opportunities for interaction among members of the profession.
 Facilitating research, arranging lectures on relevant subjects.
 Providing facilities and guidance to those studying for the Actuarial exams.

Placement
Till 2002, multinational reinsurers setting up service offices in India imported actuaries due to severe shortage of skills domestically. By 2005, an Indian actuary with at least 7 years of post-qualification experience was paid about US$40,000 in annual salary. The package rises to US$60,000 for an appointed actuary.

IAI is a statutory body established under The Actuaries Act 2006 (35 of 2006) for regulation of profession of Actuaries in India. The provisions of the said Act have come into force from 10thday of November 2006, in terms of the notification dated 8 November 2006, issued by the Government of India in the Ministry of Finance, Department of Economic Affairs. As a consequence of this, the erstwhile Actuarial Society of India was dissolved and all the Assets and Liabilities of the Actuarial Society of India were transferred to, and vested in, the Institute of Actuaries of India constituted under Section 3 of the Actuaries Act, 2006.

The erstwhile Actuarial Society of India (ASI) was established in September 1944. Since 1979 the ASI has been a Full Member of International Actuarial Association (an umbrella organizations to all actuarial bodies across the world) and is actively involved in its affairs. In 1982, the ASI was registered under Registration of Literary, Scientific and Charitable Societies Act XXI of 1860 and also under Bombay Public Charitable Trust Act, 1950. In 1989, the ASI started examinations up to Associate level, and in 1991, started conducting Fellowship level examination leading to professional qualification of an actuary, till then the accreditation was based on Institute of Actuaries, London examinations (now Institute and Faculty of Actuaries.).

The IAI has grown as well with around 9,182 student members joining the society. The current president of IAI is Mr. R Arunachalam.

Actuarial organizations
Actuaries usually belong to one or more professional bodies, often national in scope. A list may be found here: :Category:Actuarial associations

See also 
 Actuary
 Actuarial present value
 Actuarial science
 Actuarial notation
 Catastrophe modeling
 Risk theory

References

External links
 FAQs on Actuary
 Institute of Actuaries of India
 Global Indian Actuarial Network

1944 establishments in India
Actuarial associations
Insurance in India
Professional associations based in India